Amalie, Princess of Fürstenberg (Amalie Christina Caroline; née Baroness Amalie of Hochberg, formerly Countess Amalie of Hochberg and Princess Amalie of Baden; 26 January 1795 – 14 September 1869) was the consort of Charles Egon II, Prince of Fürstenberg.

Biography 
Baroness Amalie of Hochberg was born on 26 January 1795 in Karlsruhe to Charles Frederick, Grand Duke of Baden, and his second wife, Louise Caroline of Hochberg. Her parents' marriage was morganatic, and so Amalie was born without princely status and excluded from the dynastic line of the House of Zähringen. She was accorded her mother's baronial status until 1796, when her mother was made Countess of Hochberg, at which time she assumed comital rank.

Amalie's half-brother's son, Charles, Grand Duke of Baden, elevated her and her siblings to dynastic status in 1817, granting them princely rank and status with the style of Grand Ducal Highness.

On 19 April 1818 she married Charles Egon II of Fürstenberg, becoming the princess consort of Fürstenberg.

Amalie and Charles Egon II had seven children:
 Marie Elisabeth (15 March 1819 – 9 April 1897)
 Karl Egon III. (4 March 1820 – 15 March 1892)
 Princess Maria Amalia (12 February 1821 – 17 January 1899); married on 19 April 1845 Viktor I of Hohenlohe-Schillingsfürst, Duke of Ratibor.
 Maximilian Egon I (29 March 1822 – 27 July 1873); married 23 May 1860 Countess Leontine von Khevenhüller-Metsch.
 Marie Henriette (16 July 1823 – 19 September 1834)
 Emil Egon (12 September 1825 – 15 May 1899); married on 31 May 1875 Countess Leontine von Khevenhüller-Metsch.
 Pauline Wilhelmine (11 June 1829 – 3 August 1900); married on 15 April 1847 Hugo, Prince of Hohenlohe-Oehringen.

Amalie died on 14 September 1869.

Ancestry

References 

1795 births
1869 deaths
18th-century German women
19th-century German women
German baronesses
German countesses
Fürstenberg (princely family)
Princesses of Baden
Nobility from Karlsruhe
Daughters of monarchs